The Superior General of the Priestly Fraternity of St. Peter is the official title of the head of the Priestly Fraternity of St. Peter (or FSSP). The first position holder was The Very Reverend Fr. Josef Meinrad Bisig FSSP who was ordained His Grace The Most Reverend Marcel-François Lefebvre CSSp, the Founder of the Society of Saint Pius X.

Title  
The formal title in Latin is Praepositus Generalis, which may fairly be rendered as "superior general" or even, "president general".

Current Holder 
The current Superior General is The Very Reverend Andrzej Komorowski FSSP, a Polish Priest who was elected for a six year term at Our Lady of Guadalupe Seminary located in Denton, Nebraska.

List of Superior Generals

See also 
Priestly Fraternity of St Peter
Superior General of the Society of Jesus
Superior General of the Society of Saint Pius X

References 

Priestly Fraternity of St. Peter